Maria Aleksandrovna Gurova (born 16 April 1989) is a Russian retired freestyle wrestler. She competed at the 55 kg division in the 2012 European Wrestling Championships and won the bronze medal in the competition. She won the gold medal at the 2014 European Wrestling Championships after defeating Maria Prevolaraki of Greece. She learns in the Sholokhov Moscow State University for Humanities. 3x World cup runner up.

References

1989 births
Living people
Russian female sport wrestlers
European Wrestling Championships medalists
People from Yegoryevsk
Sportspeople from Moscow Oblast
21st-century Russian women
20th-century Russian women